Good Counsel Complex, also known as Convent of the Sisters of the Divine Compassion, is a national historic district located at White Plains, Westchester County, New York. The district consists of 10 contributing buildings, including the separately listed Mapleton.  In addition to Mapleton, contributing buildings in the complex includes the convent (1908, 1923 additions), chapel (1897), House of Nazareth (1891), cooking school / infirmary (1901-1902), heating plant / workshop (1898), Tilford House (1856), St. Ann's Cottage (1901), and carriage house / stable (1890).  The buildings include regionally significant examples of Romanesque Revival and Mediterranean Revival inspired architecture. The buildings housed the Academy of Our Lady of Good Counsel which closed in 2015 after the complex was sold. Parts of the complex were sold to Pace University School of Law in 1975. The Sisters continue to maintain a presence on the complex grounds.

It was added to the National Register of Historic Places in 1997.

See also
National Register of Historic Places listings in southern Westchester County, New York

References

External links
Academy of Our Lady of Good Counsel

School buildings on the National Register of Historic Places in New York (state)
Historic districts on the National Register of Historic Places in New York (state)
Mission Revival architecture in New York (state)
Italianate architecture in New York (state)
Houses in Westchester County, New York
Buildings and structures in White Plains, New York
National Register of Historic Places in Westchester County, New York